Matthew Kevin Thaiss (born May 6, 1995) is an American professional baseball catcher for the Los Angeles Angels of Major League Baseball (MLB). He made his MLB debut in 2019.

Amateur career
Thaiss attended Jackson Memorial High School in Jackson Township, New Jersey. During his career he batted .343 with 17 home runs and 70 runs batted in (RBI). He was drafted by the Boston Red Sox in the 32nd round of the 2013 Major League Baseball draft, but did not sign and attended the University of Virginia where he played for the Virginia Cavaliers.

As a freshman at Virginia in 2014, Thaiss played in 26 games with 16 starts at designated hitter. In 68 at-bats he hit .265 with seven RBIs. As a sophomore in 2015, Thaiss started 67 of 68 games, batting .323/.413/.552 with ten home runs and 64 RBIs. He played for the Hyannis Harbor Hawks of the Cape Cod Baseball League in the summer of 2015. In 2016, Thaiss played 60 games and batted .375/.473/.578 along with ten home runs. This strong play at Virginia led to Thaiss being drafted in the first round of the 2016 MLB draft by the Los Angeles Angels with the 16th overall pick.

Professional career
Thaiss signed with the Angels and was assigned to the Orem Owlz. After batting .338 with two home runs and 12 RBIs in 15 games for Orem, he was promoted to the Burlington Bees, where he hit .276 with four home runs, 31 RBIs, and a .778 OPS in 52 games to end the season. He was ranked as the Angels' top prospect at the end of the 2016 season. Thaiss spent 2017 with both the Inland Empire 66ers and the Mobile BayBears, posting a combined .274 batting average with nine home runs and 73 RBIs in 133 games, and 2018 with Mobile and the Salt Lake Bees, slashing .280/.335/.467 with 16 home runs and 76 RBIs in 125 games between both teams. He returned to Salt Lake to begin 2019.

On July 3, 2019, the Angels selected Thaiss' contract and promoted him to the major leagues. He made his major league debut that night, hitting a double in his first at-bat off of Ariel Jurado  of the Texas Rangers. As he was a catcher before being drafted, he has converted into a first baseman and a third baseman after being drafted. On the season, Thaiss hit .211 with eight home runs in 53 games. In 2020, Thaiss went 3-for-21 with one home run for a .143/.280/.286 batting line across eight games.

In 2021, the Angels had Thaiss return to playing catcher.

References

External links

Virginia Cavaliers bio

1995 births
Living people
Jackson Memorial High School alumni
Sportspeople from Jackson Township, New Jersey
Baseball players from New Jersey
Major League Baseball first basemen
Los Angeles Angels players
Virginia Cavaliers baseball players
Hyannis Harbor Hawks players
Orem Owlz players
Burlington Bees players
Inland Empire 66ers of San Bernardino players
Mobile BayBears players
Scottsdale Scorpions players
Salt Lake Bees players
Tigres del Licey players
American expatriate baseball players in the Dominican Republic
Madison Mallards players